The 2006–07 season of the Belgian First Division began on July 28, 2006, and concluded on May 19, 2007. The championship was decided in the penultimate round on May 12, 2007, when Anderlecht moved five points clear of runners-up Genk to retain the title and win their 29th League Championship. At the other end of the table, the struggle to avoid automatic relegation went on until the final round, and it was Lierse who eventually prevailed. Having spent the entire season at the bottom of the standings and only just managing to close an eleven-point gap up to 17th, the Lier side won their last game to climb past Beveren and send the latter down to the Second Division. However, Lierse went on to lose the playoffs and was relegated anyway.

Clubs
Eighteen teams played in the 2006-07 first division. Twelve teams were from Flanders, four clubs from Wallonia and just two clubs from the Brussels-Capital Region.

New teams
La Louvière had been relegated at the end of the previous season with Mons replacing them as they won the Belgian Second Division. Lierse had managed to win the promotion playoff and thus they remained in the first division.

Overview

Manager changes
 August 30 - Standard Liège fires Johan Boskamp.
 August 30 - Michel Preud'homme quits his job as technical director to take up the job of manager with Standard Liège.
 October 29 - Lokeren fires Ariël Jacobs.
 November 7 - Thomas Caers quits his job as manager of Sint Truiden as he feels the players don't respect him anymore after a series of bad results.
 November 13 - René Trost agrees with the management of Lierse to split up and each go their own way. At that time Lierse is in last position, with two points out of 12 matches.
 November 22 - Lierse finds a new manager as Kjetil Rekdal is contracted to try to keep the team in the first division. In Sint Truiden, Henk Houwaart is the new manager.
 November 26 - Lokeren announces that Slavoljub Muslin will sign a contract as the new manager within the next few days.
 January 28 - After losing 0-1 at home to Roeselare, the staff of Club Brugge is under fire from supporters and media yet again. The day after, coach Emilio Ferrera and assistant Franky Van der Elst get fired and sports director Marc Degryse chooses to resign himself. A former Macedonian ex-player, Cedomir Janevski, is appointed as the new manager.
 February 1 - At R.E. Mouscron, Gil Vandenbrouck resigns after disappointing results and is given another job at the club. Ariël Jacobs is the new coach.
 March 19 - Marc Brys announces he will finish the season as trainer at K.F.C. Germinal Beerschot, but will then quit his job. No new trainer is announced to replace him.
 March 25 - Walter Meeuws is fired at K.S.K. Beveren, assistant-coach Edy De Bolle becomes caretaker until the end of the season.
 March 26 - Next season, Cercle Brugge K.S.V. coach Harm Van Veldhoven will take up the job at K.F.C. Germinal Beerschot. Cercle Brugge are looking for a new coach.
 April 3 - Sint-Truiden fires Henk Houwaart. Assistant-trainer Peter Voets takes over.
 April 15 - At Lokeren, assistant coach Rudy Cossey announces he will leave the club after 12 years and take up the job of head coach at second division team Oud-Heverlee Leuven next season. In Leuven, Guido Brepoels had announced a few weeks earlier that he was leaving at the end of the season to take up the job at another second division team, KVSK United.
 April 20 - Ariël Jacobs, head coach at Mouscron, is named by many sources to become the new assistant coach of Franky Vercauteren at Anderlecht next season. Glen De Boeck, his assistant coach at that time, is applying for a job at Cercle Brugge. Franky Van der Elst is doing the same thing and a decision concerning the new coaching team of Cercle Brugge for the new season is said to be announced soon.
 April 23 - Glen De Boeck will be the head coach of Cercle Brugge during the upcoming season.
 April 26 - Club Brugge announces that Charleroi coach Jacky Mathijssen will be their new head coach for the upcoming season. Coach Cedomir Janevski is offered a position as his assistant but is still considering the offer.
 April 28 - As both Club Brugge and Charleroi are still in the running for the fifth place and thus also possibly a ticket for European football next season, chairman Abbas Bayat decides to fire coach Jacky Mathijssen. Later that day the supporters chant Mathijssen's name during the match between Charleroi and Lokeren to express their unhappiness with Bayat's decision. Philippe Van de Walle is the caretaker for the four remaining matches of the season.

League standings

Promotion and relegation playoff

Results

Top scorers

See also
2006–07 in Belgian football

Belgian Pro League seasons
Belgian
1